Paul D. Lefebvre (born January 26, 1945) is an American journalist and politician who served as a member of the Vermont House of Representatives from the Essex-Caladonia-Orleans district as an independent from 2015 to 2023. He previously served as a Republican in the legislature, but left during the 2020 election citing the "po­lar­iz­ing times".

Early life and education

Paul D. Lefebvre was born in Newport, Vermont, on January 26, 1945, to Theodore Lefebvre. During his education at Brighton High School before his graduation in 1962, he served on the student council, as class president in the 10th and 12th grades, and as a delegate to Boys/Girls State in 1962. He graduated from Springfield College, during which he studied abroad in Europe, with a Bachelor of Arts degree in 1967, and from Arizona State University with a master's degree in European history. He has worked for The Chronicle since 1978.

Vermont House of Representatives

Bill Johnson, a member of the Vermont House of Representatives for seventeen years, retired during the 2014 election. Lefebvre ran for the Republican nomination after Johnson announcement as he believed that Johnson was "unbeatable as he was highly respected in all the towns he served". He defeated Kenn Stransky and Maurice G. Connary in the Republican primary and faced no opposition in the 2014 and 2016 elections. He defeated Democratic nominee Martha W. Allen in the 2018 election. He ran for reelection in the 2020 election as an independent candidate stating that he would "rather be an inde­pendent with Re­pub­li­can lean­ings" due to the "po­lar­iz­ing times" and defeated Allen.

He serves on the Joint Energy committee, and as vice-chair of the Natural Resources, Fish, and Wildlife committee. Lefebvre endorsed endorsed Phil Scott during the 2018 gubernatorial election and Scott Milne during the 2020 lieutenant gubernatorial election. He voted in favor of legislation to increase the minimum wage in 2020, but later voted to sustain Scott's veto of the legislation.

Electoral history

References

21st-century American politicians
1945 births
Arizona State University alumni
Living people
Members of the Vermont House of Representatives
People from Newport (city), Vermont
Springfield College (Massachusetts) alumni
Vermont Independents
Vermont Republicans